Onoclea is a genus of plants in the family Onocleaceae, native to moist habitats in eastern Asia and eastern North America. They are deciduous ferns with sterile fronds arising from creeping rhizomes in spring, dying down at first frost. Fertile fronds appear in late summer. Depending on the authority, the genus contains one to five species.

Species
In the Pteridophyte Phylogeny Group classification of 2016 (PPG I), Onoclea has a single species:
  – sensitive fern (eastern Asia, eastern North America)

Transferred species
The following Onoclea species have been transferred to other genera as indicated below.
  = 
  = 
  = 
  = 
  = 
  = 
  = 
   = 
  = 
  = 
  = 
  =  – deer fern (Europe, western North America)
  = 
  = 
  =

References

Polypodiales
Monotypic fern genera